Helena Township is a township in Griggs County, North Dakota, United States.

Demographics
Its population during the 2010 census was 50.

Location within Griggs County
Helena Township is located in Township 145 Range 60 west of the Fifth principal meridian.

References

Townships in Griggs County, North Dakota